Minot High School (MHS) is the public high school in Minot, North Dakota, divided between two main campuses: Magic City (grades 11-12) and Central (grades 9-10). MHS also includes an alternative campus: Souris River Campus.

Athletics
The boys' athletic teams are known as the "Magicians" or "Magi", while the girls' teams are called the "Majettes". The school's mascot is a magician and the varsity teams compete against the largest high schools in the state in Class A (Class AAA for football, see North Dakota High School Activities Association).

State championships

Boys
Football, Class 'A': 1910, 1935, 1941, 1980
Basketball, Class 'A': 1916, 1934, 1936, 1937, 1949, 1950, 1955, 1961, 1965, 1971, 1980, 1988, 1990, 1995, 1999, 2015, 2016, 2017, 2022
Hockey: 1992 (first West team to win), 2015
Wrestling, Class 'A': 1967, 1968, 1969, 1970, 1971, 1993
Swimming: 1975, 1978, 1979, 1980, 1981, 1982, 1983, 1988, 1989, 1990, 1991, 1992, 1993, 1999, 2000, 2001, 2002, 2003, 2004, 2005, 2006, 2007, 2008, 2010, 2011, 2018, 2019, 2020, 2021
Soccer: 1989, 2006
Track and field, Class 'A': 1942, 1974, 1975, 1976, 1977, 1978, 1979, 1980, 1984 co-champions, 1985, 2001, 2002
Baseball, Class 'A': 1999, 2005 (first awarded in 1994)

Girls
Basketball: Class 'A': 1978, 2022
Soccer: Class 'A': 2021, 2022
Swimming: 1978, 1979, 1980, 1981, 1982, 1983, 1984, 1985, 1986, 1987, 1988, 1994, 1995, 1996, 1997, 1998, 2003, 2004, 2005, 2006, 2007, 2008, 2013
Track and field, Class 'A': 1966 (one class), 1972, 1978, 1981, 1984, 1988, 1989, 1991, 1992, 1993, 1994, 1995, 1996, 1997

Notable alumni
Josh Duhamel, actor
Ryan Bollinger, baseball pitcher
Gary Cederstrom, retired Major League Baseball umpire
 Jerry Gaetz, North Dakota state senator
David C. Jones, U.S. Air Force general, Chairman of the Joint Chiefs of Staff
Herro Mustafa, U.S. Ambassador to Bulgaria

References

External links
 Magic City Campus (grades 11–12)
 Central Campus (grades 9–10)
 Souris River Campus - website

Public high schools in North Dakota
Buildings and structures in Minot, North Dakota
North Dakota High School Activities Association (Class A)
North Dakota High School Activities Association (Class AAA Football)
Schools in Ward County, North Dakota